Mountain Lake is a small lake in the hamlet of Cooks Falls in Delaware County, New York. It drains into Beaver Kill.

See also
 List of lakes in New York

References 

Lakes of New York (state)
Lakes of Delaware County, New York